Hasanpura is a Community development block and a town in district of Siwan, in Bihar state of India. It is one out of 13 blocks of Siwan Subdivision. The headquarter of the block is at Hasanpura town.

The block is divided into many Gram Panchayats and villages.

Gram Panchayats
Gram panchayats of Hasanpura block in Siwan Subdivision, Siwan district.

 Aranda
 Gaighat
 Harpura Kotwa
 Hasanpura
 Laheji
 Mandrapali
 Pakari
 Phalpura
 Piyaur
 Pajanpura
 Pahuli
 Sheikhpura
 Telkathu
 Usari buzurg

See also
Administration in Bihar

References

Community development blocks in Siwan district